"Only Wanna Be with You" is a song by American alternative rock band Hootie & the Blowfish. After being included on the group's EP Kootchypop, it was released on July 18, 1995, as the third single from their breakthrough album, Cracked Rear View (1994). It peaked at number six on the US Billboard Hot 100, number one on the Billboard Mainstream Top 40 chart, number three on the Billboard Adult Contemporary chart, and number two on the Billboard Mainstream Rock Tracks chart.

Internationally, "Only Wanna Be with You" topped the Canadian RPM Top Singles chart for three weeks, becoming the second-most-successful song of 1995. It also found success in Iceland, rising to number four on the Icelandic Singles Chart, and reached the top 40 in Australia and New Zealand. It is the band's signature song. In 2021, American rapper Post Malone released a cover of the song for the 25th anniversary of the Pokémon franchise.

Content
One verse of the song describes "[putting] on a little Dylan". The verse then references songs on Bob Dylan's Blood on the Tracks, quoting extensively from "Idiot Wind". The song then mentions "Tangled Up in Blue". According to Rucker, Dylan's management were aware of the lyrics and had no problem with them; however, when the song became a hit, they objected. He told Rolling Stone that "it never got to the point where we were sued... When we first did that song we sent it to the publishing company and everything was fine. We played it for years and had a really big hit with it. Then they wanted some money, and they got it." VH1 reported that Dylan received an out-of-court settlement in 1995 for $350,000.

Also mentioned in the bridge of the song is a reference, "I'm such a baby cause the Dolphins make me cry", alluding to Darius Rucker's favorite sports team, the Miami Dolphins.

Critical reception
Steve Baltin from Cash Box picked "Only Wanna Be with You" as Pick of the Week, writing that "this catchy upbeat gem shows why Hootie & The Blowfish can do no wrong when it comes to the charts." He added, "Hootie’s sound is never more mainstream than it is here, as the rocking and danceable beat is accompanied by a perky chorus of “I only wanna be with you.” Like their previous hit singles, this track will rocket up the charts, gaining huge support from AAA and CHR."

Music video
The accompanying music video for "Only Wanna Be with You", similar to the song, had a sports theme, incorporating many elements from ESPN's SportsCenter. The video featured appearances by (then-current) SportsCenter anchors Keith Olbermann, Dan Patrick, Mike Tirico, Charley Steiner and Chris Berman, reporting on the band playing in games with several professional athletes, including Dan Marino, Fred Couples, Gary McCord, Alonzo Mourning, Muggsy Bogues, Alex English, Walt Williams, and Charles Smith. Rucker said the video was his idea, adding, "It was just a way to meet all our idols."

A portion of the music video was filmed on the Poolesville Golf Course and Potomac Valley Lodge in Poolesville, Maryland, as well as on the floor of Reckord Armory at the University of Maryland.  Additionally, the scenes in which Rucker and Dan Marino are playing catch, were filmed on the football field of Hinsdale Central High School in Hinsdale, Illinois.

Track listings

Charts

Weekly charts

Year-end charts

Post Malone version

On February 25, 2021, American rapper and singer Post Malone released a cover version for the 25th anniversary of the Japanese media franchise Pokémon. Malone's version contains samples of music from the video games and the Dolphins reference changed to reflect him being a Dallas Cowboys fan. The cover garnered attention for the unusual circumstances of its release. Hootie and the Blowfish vocalist Darius Rucker gave his approval of the cover on Twitter. "Only Wanna Be with You" is included on the track listing of Pokémon 25: The Album, scheduled for release in the second half of 2021 through Capitol Records.

Charts

Weekly charts

References

1992 songs
1995 singles
2021 singles
Atlantic Records singles
Hootie & the Blowfish songs
Miami Dolphins
RPM Top Singles number-one singles
Song recordings produced by Don Gehman
Songs involved in plagiarism controversies
Songs written by Bob Dylan
Songs written by Darius Rucker
Songs written by Jim Sonefeld
Songs written by Mark Bryan
Cultural depictions of Bob Dylan
Post Malone songs